Samuel David Ferguson (January 1, 1842 – August 2, 1916) was an African American clergyman in Liberia. He was the first African American to be elected as a bishop of the Episcopal Church in Liberia.

Biography
Samuel David Ferguson was born in Charleston, South Carolina, on January 1, 1842.

He moved with his family to Liberia when he was six years old. He was ordained a deacon on December 28, 1865, and a priest on March 15, 1868. He was consecrated as bishop on June 24, 1885, (Saint John the Baptist's Feast Day) at Grace Church, New York, becoming the first black member of the House of Bishops. He married Mary Leonora Montgomery.

As Missionary Bishop of Liberia, he founded what is now Cuttington University. Ferguson also established the Bromley Mission School. One of his protégés, Raphael Morgan, became an Episcopal priest in the United States but ultimately converted to the Russian Orthodox Church.

Ferguson remained in Liberia until his death in Monrovia in 1916.

See also

Notes

References
Representative Man - A Note on Samuel David Ferguson: America's 1st Black Bishop, Seward Montgomery Cooper (2005)
Handbooks on Missions of the Episcopal Church Number IV Liberia, National Council of the Protestant Episcopal Church, Department of Foreign Missions, New York, 1924, p. 50
History of the Afro-American Group of the Episcopal Church, Baltimore, Maryland: Church Advocate Press, 1922, p. 206, by George F. Bragg
History of the Episcopal Church in Liberia 1821-1980, American Theological Library Association and Scarecrow Press, Inc. London (1992), p. 155, by D. Elwood Dunn

External links

Profile, Encyclopædia Britannica, Guide to Black History

Americo-Liberian people
Bishops of the Episcopal Church (United States)
1842 births
1916 deaths
American Anglican missionaries
Anglican bishops in Mission
Anglican missionaries in Liberia
Cuttington University
Liberian Episcopalians
American emigrants to Liberia
19th-century American Episcopalians
Anglican bishops of Liberia